The Muttler (3,296 m) is the highest mountain in the Samnaun Alps. It is located south of Samnaun in the Swiss canton of Graubünden. From 1972 - 2011 a transmitter was located west of the summit.

See also
 List of mountains of Graubünden
 List of most isolated mountains of Switzerland

References

External links

 Muttler on Summitpost
 Muttler on Hikr

Mountains of Switzerland
Mountains of the Alps
Alpine three-thousanders
Engadin
Mountains of Graubünden
Samnaun
Valsot